Amy Alexander may refer to:

 Amy Alexander (artist),  American artist
 Amy L. Alexander (born 1963), American journalist
 Amy Alexander, host on WZWZ radio
 Amy Alexander, fictional character in the Donna Parker novels by Marcia Levin

See also
Amy Alexandra, British Big Brother housemate and glamour model